Víctor Armando Retamal Ahumada (born 6 March 1998) is a Chilean footballer who plays as a defender for Santiago Wanderers.

Career statistics

Club

Notes

References

1998 births
Living people
Chilean footballers
Association football defenders
Santiago Wanderers footballers
Unión La Calera footballers
Universidad de Concepción footballers
Chilean Primera División players